The Olympus Zuiko Digital 40-150mm F3.5-4.5 is an interchangeable lens for Four Thirds system digital single-lens reflex cameras announced by Olympus Corporation on September 28, 2004.

References
https://www.dpreview.com/products/olympus/lenses/olympus_40-150_3p5-4p5

Camera lenses introduced in 2004
040-150mm 1:3.5-4.5